Kellog is a rural locality (a settlement) in Turukhansky District of Krasnoyarsk Krai, Russia. It is located by the Yeloguy River.

Population
Kellog is one of the three localities in which Ket people, a little-known ethnic group whose language is thought by some linguists to be related to the Na-Dene languages of Native Americans, live. It is also the only location in Russia where the Ket language is taught in schools.

As of the 2010 Census, the ethnic composition in Kellog was as follows:
Ket people: 216 (70,6 %)
Russians: 71 (23,2 %)
Others: 19 (6,2 %)

The tomb of Alexander Kotusov (1955–2019), a Ket folk singer and poet, is near the village.

References

Notes

Sources

External links
Pictures of Kellog people

Ket people

Rural localities in Turukhansky District
Road-inaccessible communities of Krasnoyarsk Krai